The EPs 1992–1994 is a compilation album by David Gray, released in July 2001. The compilation's release coincided with Hut Records' reissues of Gray's first two albums, A Century Ends and Flesh. The EPs 1992–1994 collects the singles and their B-sides released during that time period, as well as the enhanced music videos for "Shine" and "Wisdom."

Track listing

Credits

Musicians
 David Gray – vocals, guitar

Production
 Produced by David Gray and David Anderson.

References

David Gray (musician) albums
2001 compilation albums